David and the Magic Pearl (sw. David och de magiska pärlorna; pol. Dawid i Sandy; known as David & Sandy internationally) is a Polish/Swedish animated film released in 1988.

Summary

David, a boy who stays with his parents in a small cabin in a jungle, not only gets a reliable puppy named Pips for his birthday, but he also befriends a baby eagle who he names Sandy. They discover that a stereotypical boss, Mr. Stealmore (named in the English version), is after a set of pearls which were to be kept safe by a group of aliens who landed in the jungle. Also they met a woman named Fawn Doe who is the slave to Mr. Stealmore capturing animals and placed in cages. Later that David learned that Fawn is not as bad as it seems and she changed into Nature clothes now as Nature woman who understands why it is important for the pearls to be protected. Now, the trio have to band together and save the jungle from Mr. Stealmore, who has also plotted to bulldoze the jungle and build a city in its place.

Cast

Additional Voices
Barbara Goodson

Awards 

 1987 – Wiesław Zięba Award of the Head of Cinematography in the field of animated film
 1988 – Wiesław Zięba Poznań (FF for Children) – Children's Jury Award

See also
 List of animated feature films of 1988

External links 
 
 The English version

References 

1988 films
1980s children's fantasy films
Polish animated fantasy films
1980s Polish-language films
Swedish animated fantasy films
1980s Swedish films